Life is a 1928 British silent drama film, which was directed by Adelqui Migliar and starred Migliar, Marie Ault and Marcel Vibert. It was based on the 1895 play Juan José by Joaquín Dicenta. The film was made by Whitehall Films. While the company's new studio was constructed at Elstree, the film was shot on location in Spain.

Cast
 Adelqui Migliar as Juan José 
 Marie Ault as Isidora 
 Marcel Vibert as Paco 
 Manuela Del Rio as Rosa 
 José Lucio as Andrés 
 Denise Lorys as Tournela

References

Bibliography
 Low, Rachel. The History of British Film: Volume IV, 1918–1929. Routledge, 1997.
 Thatcher Gies, David. The Theatre in Nineteenth-Century Spain. Cambridge University Press, 2005.

External links

1928 films
British drama films
British silent feature films
1928 drama films
Films directed by Adelqui Migliar
British films based on plays
Films set in Spain
Films shot in Spain
British black-and-white films
1920s English-language films
1920s British films
Silent drama films